Waltham on the Wolds is a village and former civil parish, now in the parish of Waltham on the Wolds and Thorpe Arnold, in the Melton borough of Leicestershire, England. In 1931 the parish had a population of 510. The population of Waltham on the Wolds and Thorpe Arnold was 967 in 2011.

Geography
The parish is the site of Waltham television transmitting station, which serves most of the East Midlands. Apart from the main village, the parish includes the village of Thorpe Arnold, just to the north-east of Melton. To the south-east is Stonesby, which is nearer to the  transmitter. The village is on a ridge, which has an escarpment close to the north-west that dramatically overlooks the Vale of Belvoir.

History
One of the earliest mentions of this place is in the Domesday book where it is listed among lands given to Hugh de Grandmesnil by the King. It was valued at six pounds.

The station was a terminus, and there was no regular passenger service. The line was owned by GNR and was used mainly by iron ore trains from quarries near Knipton, Eaton and Branston. The remains of the line are still visible. There was a trailing junction with the Eaton Branch Railway (opened in 1884) to the south west of the station. The ore trains came off this branch and then reversed before travelling to Scalford.

On 1 April 1936 the parish was abolished and merged with Thorpe Arnold to form "Waltham".

Quarries
Two iron-ore quarries were operated at Waltham briefly in the 1880s. One was begun in 1882 by the Waltham Iron Ore Company either side of what is now the A607 north of the village. The other was further north in the northern angle between the A607 and the narrow road to Eaton. Both quarries closed in 1885. Each had a horse-drawn narrow-gauge tramway which carried the ore to the railway. The more southerly of the two quarries may have possessed a steam locomotive. Nothing can now be seen of the two quarries except (in 1992) the stone parapets of a bridge under the A607. This was used by the more southerly of the two tramways.

There was a quarry close to the railway, which was worked for limestone between 1931 and 1941.

Pet nutrition
Waltham is also known for its connection with Mars (previously Masterfoods UK), and the Waltham Centre for Pet Nutrition which carries out research into the effect of diet on cats, dogs and horses (for Spillers).

Amenities
The parish church, dedicated to St Mary Magdalene, is built of a local, honey-coloured ironstone used for several churches in the district (e. g. at South Croxton). On 27 February 2008, the church spire was badly damaged by the 2008 Lincolnshire earthquake. The top  of it had to be rebuilt, at an estimated cost of some £100,000. The work was completed in 2009. The church contains some Norman features, with much building from about 1300. It was restored and extended in 1850, when the supervising architect was George Gilbert Scott.

The Church of England primary school has a pre-school attached. It received a grade of outstanding in a 2011 inspection by Ofsted.

The one surviving pub in the village, the Royal Horseshoes, is in Melton Road. It was refurbished in 2010 and also provides meals and accommodation.

Gallery

References

External links

Leicestershire Villages
Parish Council
Primary school
Church spire appeal
Former railway station
Wikimapia

Villages in Leicestershire
Former civil parishes in Leicestershire
Borough of Melton